Pasko Kuzman (Macedonian: Паско Кузман; born 1947) is a Macedonian archaeologist.

Work
Kuzman has been working on the whole territory of North Macedonia, but especially in the Skopje area and Lake Ohrid, one of the deepest lakes in Europe. There, he has been excavating 3,000-year-old submerged sites of Lychnidos, and some remains in the area of the Samuil's Fortress, which were built probably at the time of Philip II.

Kuzman is considered in North Macedonia to be the most deserved man for the archaeologist findings in the country in the recent years.

In 2013 he was arrested on antiquities smuggling charges, and placed under house arrest for 30 days. A year later he was found guilty of aiding a criminal ring in excavating and selling off valuable archeological artefacts, and was sentenced to three years in prison.

Kuzman is a firm believer that the enduring archeological mystery of the tomb of Alexander the Great is hidden in southeastern parts of North  Macedonia, and pledged in an interview in late 2012 that he will never stop searching for the tomb.

Private life
Pasko Kuzman is married and has four daughters, most recently he became a grandfather.

Pasko Kuzman is a self-proclaimed time traveller. He wears three watches on his left wrist, which he says help him travel through time: one takes him back to the Bronze and Neolithic Age, one takes him to the future, and the third is "The Archeologists' Watch," which alerts him to the presence of gold.

References

Macedonian archaeologists
Living people
1947 births
People from Ohrid Municipality